Holmen High School is a high school in Holmen, Wisconsin operated by the Holmen School District. As of 2016, school enrollment was 1,112. The current facility was opened in 1994 and was expanded in 2000. 2020 led to another expansion after the referendum passed in 2019. Holmen High School is a WIAA Division 1 school  in sports and is a North Central Association Renaissance School.

Academics

Holmen High School offers Advanced Placement classes.

Holmen High is an NCA/Renaissance School. The Renaissance Program is an academic recognition/reward program in which students are recognized for their academic efforts by academic letters, plaques, and certificates; coupons from local businesses; parking privileges; special academic pep assemblies; and other incentives. Over 20 local businesses support the Renaissance Program. Students are also recognized for their academic commitment and achievements in the Renaissance Program through the Maroon high honor roll and White honor roll. Maroon high honor roll students must have a GPA between 3.67-4.33, and White honor roll students much have a GPA between 3.00-3.66.

Athletics
The school's sports teams have won five Wisconsin state titles: summer baseball, 1990; girls’ basketball 1995; softball 1999; and gymnastics in 2005 and 2006. The gymnastics team came in third at the 2007 state championships, falling short in their attempt to win a third consecutive Division 2 title.

Extracurricular activities 
HHS has two competitive show choirs, a unisex women's group called Midwest Magic and a mixed group called Midwest Express. Both Express and Magic have won numerous awards in their respective categories, as Express won two competitions in 2018. The choir program also hosts their own yearly competition, called Gathering of the Stars.

References

 https://dpi.wi.gov/cst/data-collections/student/ises/published-data/excel

External links
Welcome to Holmen High School
Holmen School District

Public high schools in Wisconsin
Schools in La Crosse County, Wisconsin
Educational institutions established in 1912
1912 establishments in Wisconsin